Piz Fedoz (3,190 m) is a mountain in the Bernina Range of the Alps, located south of the Maloja Pass in the canton of Graubünden. It lies on the range between the Val Forno and the Val Fedoz.

References

External links
 Piz Fedoz on Hikr

Bernina Range
Mountains of Graubünden
Mountains of the Alps
Alpine three-thousanders
Mountains of Switzerland
Bregaglia